Flavius Annius Eucharius Epiphanius (floruit 412–414) was praefectus urbi of the city of Rome from October 15, 412 to May 27, 414. He restored the Curia Julia.

Sources 

 Prosopography of the Later Roman Empire, Volume 2, "Fl. Annius Eucharius Epiphanius 7"

5th-century Romans
Urban prefects of Rome
Annii